Lot 60 is a township in Queens County, Prince Edward Island, Canada.  It is part of St. John's Parish. In the 1767 land lottery, Lot 60 was awarded to Major John Wrightson and Captain Daniel Shaw of the 42nd Regiment of Foot.

According to the Canada 2001 Census:
Population: 320
% Change (1996-2001): -3.6
Dwellings: 153
Area (km².): 82.76
Density (persons per km².): 3.9

Communities
Caledonia
Culloden
Flat River
Lewes
Melleville
Pinette South
Roseberry
Selkirk Road

References

60
Geography of Queens County, Prince Edward Island